Oleg Valeryevich Sokolov (born 9 July 1956) is a Russian convicted murderer and former historian who specialized in the Napoleonic era. In November 2019, he murdered, then subsequently dismembered and decapitated his 24-year-old mistress and former student Anastasia Yeshchenko. In December 2020, he was found guilty of intentional murder and sentenced to 12.5 years in high-security prison. He was a docent in history at Saint Petersburg State University until his dismissal.

Biography 

Oleg Sokolov was born on 9 July 1956 in Leningrad (present-day Saint Petersburg), Russian SFSR, Soviet Union.

In 1979, he graduated with a specialist degree in physics and engineering from the Faculty of Physics and Mechanics of the Leningrad Polytechnic Institute.

In 1984, he graduated with honors from the Department of Modern and Contemporary History,  of Leningrad State University.

In 1991, under the supervision of Professor , a Doctor of Historical Sciences, he defended his dissertation at St. Petersburg State University for the degree of Candidate of Historical Sciences on the topic of The Officer Corps of the French Army Under the Ancien Régime and During the Revolution of 1789–1799 (speciality 07.00.03 – general history). The official opponents were Professor , a Doctor of Historical Sciences, and researcher at the  Sergey Iskyul, a Candidate of Historical Sciences. The external review was conducted by the Herzen State Pedagogical University of Russia.

Since 2000, he had been a Docent of the Department of Modern History, Faculty of History of St. Petersburg State University.

He is the author of a number of works on the military history of Europe of the 17th–early 19th centuries. In 1999, he published a major study, Napoleon's Army, which was translated into French in 2003. In 2006, he published the two-volume monograph Austerlitz. Napoleon, Russia and Europe, 1799–1805, a study of the premises and course of Napoleon's first war against the anti-French coalition. He translated into Russian and supplemented with extensive commentary Memoirs of the Napoleonic Wars 1802–1815 by French officer Octave Levavasseur, who took part in all military campaigns (except for the Russian campaign of 1812) by Napoleon Bonaparte.

He was a prominent figure in Russian historical reenactment. In 1976, he founded the first reenactment group of the Napoleonic era. In February 1989, the Federation of Military History Clubs of the USSR was created and Sokolov became its president. In subsequent years, Sokolov continued to lead the association of clubs involved in reenactment (Military-Historical Association of Russia (1996), All-Russian Military-Historical Social Movement (2006)).

He became a chevalier of the Legion of Honour in 2003.

Arrest for murder and sentence
There is an ongoing investigation by the Investigative Committee of Russia. On 11 November, Sokolov was charged with wilful murder (article 105 of the Criminal Code) and was arrested for two months until 8 January 2020 with the detention in the Kresty Prison. On 13 November, his defense lawyer said that Sokolov had given full testimony on the case (he had previously refused to do so, referring to the 51st article of the Constitution of the Russian Federation).

According to the investigation, Sokolov was found in the Moyka River in Saint Petersburg with a backpack containing the woman's arms and a weapon. Local media claims he was drunk and fell into the river as he tried to dispose of the body parts. Police found more body parts in his home, but the package with the victim's torso was not retrieved from the river until 11 November. He has admitted guilt and is willing to cooperate in the investigation.  According to Sokolov's defense lawyer, his client filed a confession, but the defense team does not intend to exclude the version of self-incrimination. In addition, his lawyer noted that Sokolov was assigned a psychiatric examination. As Sokolov himself stated during a meeting of the Oktyabrsky District Court of St. Petersburg, the crime was committed on the basis of a personal conflict, because, according to him, Yeshchenko had “recently a terrible reaction to my children” and “she started to freak at their mention” and then they both “lost control” during a quarrel and then “she attacked me with a knife”. At the same time, according to the local media, the young woman was killed in her sleep by a shot in the head. Then three more shots followed, also in the head.

He is said to have planned to get rid of the body before publicly committing suicide dressed as Napoleon at the Peter and Paul Fortress.

The representative of the Investigative Committee also promised to verify Sokolov's involvement in the beating of another woman. In 2018, the Moskovskij Komsomolets newspaper published an article in which Sokolov's student accused the lecturer of brutal beating in 2008.

Soon after reports of his detention, the Russian Military Historical Society (RMHS), chaired by Minister of Culture Vladimir Medinsky, removed from its website all mention of Oleg Sokolov, who formerly was a member of its scientific council, and the adviser to the RMHS chairman announced that she had heard his name for the first time. French  (ISSEP), founded by Marion Maréchal, the niece of Marine Le Pen, had removed him from his position on its scientific committee on Saturday (9 November).

He was subsequently dismissed from his post at Saint Petersburg State University.

On 25 December 2020, Sokolov was sentenced to twelve years and a half in jail after being convicted of the murder.

Works 
Oleg Sokolov is the author of five monographs and over 300 articles on the history of the Napoleonic Wars. Most of Sokolov's works have been translated into English.

Monographs 
 in Russian

 
 
 
 
 
 	
 
 	
 
 

 in French

 
 
 

 in Polish

Articles 

 in Russian
 Соколов О. В. Высшие офицеры французской армии и революционное правительство в 1792—1794 гг. // От Старого порядка к Революции / под ред. проф. В. Г. Ревуненкова. — Л., 1988.
 Соколов О. В. Ульмская операция 1805 года // Орел. — 1993. — № 1, 2, 3.
 Соколов О. В. Офицеры короля // Империя истории. — 2001. — № 1.
 Соколов О. В. Генерал Антуан-Анри Жомини и его роль в развитии российской военной науки // Швейцарцы в Петербурге. — СПб, 2002.
 Соколов О. В. Испания в огне. Сомо-Сьерра // Империя истории. — 2002. — № 2.
 Соколов О. В. Рыцарство как элита средневекового общества // Империя истории. — 2002. — № 2.
 Соколов О. В. Час отваги и мужества. Битва при Никополе // Империя истории. — 2002. — № 2.
 Соколов О. В. Испания в огне. Погоня за Муром // Империя истории. — 2002. — № 3.
 Соколов О. В. Дух армии Наполеона // Империя истории. — 2002. — № 3.
 Соколов О. В. Французская армия и переворот 18 брюмера // Наполеон. Легенда и реальность. Материалы научных конференций и наполеоновских чтений. 1996—1998 / Сост. А. Васильев, Г. Л. Медынцева. — СПб.: Минувшее, 2003. — 444 с. — 500 экз. — .
 Соколов О. В. Начало Польской кампании или должны ли французы умирать за Польшу? // Империя истории. — 2006. — № 4.
 Соколов О. В. Рокруа — триумф юной отваги // Империя истории. — 2006. — № 4.
 Соколов О. В. Записки генерала В. И. Левенштерна", Подготовка текста, вступительная статья и комментарии // Труды кафедры истории Нового и новейшего времени. 2013. № 10 / Сост. Т. Н. Гончарова. — СПб, 2013. — С. 120—150
 Соколов О. В. Поляки на службе Наполеона в сражении на Березине, 28 ноября 1812 г. // Desperta Ferro (Madrid), 2013 г.
 Соколов О. В. Русско-французские отношения накануне войны 1805 г. // Труды кафедры истории Нового и новейшего времени. 2013. № 11. / Сост. Т. Н. Гончарова. — СПб., 2013. С. 67—84
 Соколов О. В. Вступление // к монографии А. Королёва: «По следам Великой армии Наполеона»
 Соколов О. В. Военно-политическая обстановка во время подписания Тильзитского мира и реакция на договор в свете синхронных источников // Вестник СПбГУ. Серия 2. — 2015. — Выпуск 1. — С. 35—46
 Соколов О. В. Итальянская армия Бонапарта накануне похода 1796 г. // Труды кафедры Новой и Новейшей истории. — 2015. — № 15. — С. 50—67

 in French

 Sokolov O. V. Le regiment Pavlovski en 1811 // Tradition Magazine. № 52, 1991.
 Sokolov O. V. La campagne de Russie. Les origines du conflit // Napoléon Ier. № 5, 2001.
 Sokolov O. V. La campagne de Russie. L’offensive de Napoléon, de Vilna a Witebsk // Napoléon Ier. № 6, 2001.
 Sokolov O. V. La campagne de Russie. La bataille de Smolensk // Napoleon Ier. № 7, 2001.
 Sokolov O. V. La campagne de Russie. La Moskowa // Napoléon Ier. № 8, 2001.
 Sokolov O. V. La campagne de Russie. De Moscou a Viazma // Napoléon Ier. № 9, 2001.
 Sokolov O. V. La campagne de Russie. Berezina // Napoléon Ier. № 10, 2001.
 Sokolov O. V. 1805 — Napoleon marche vers Austerlitz (1). Wertingen — Haslach — Elchingen // Revue de l'histoire napoléonienne. № 3, 2005.
 Sokolov O. V. 1805 — Napoleon marche vers Austerlitz (2). Amstetten — Durrenstein — Hollabrunn // Revue de l'histoire napoléonienne, № 6, 2006.
 Sokolov O. V. Austerlitz 1805. Le plan de Napoléon — la bataille d’Austerlitz — le bilan // Revue de l'histoire napoléonienne. № 27, 2009.
 Sokolov O. V. «Los Polacos en el Berezina» // Historia militar y política del mundo moderno, siglos XVI—XIX. Desperta Ferro, Madrid, 2014, № 8, р. 46—53.

Translations

Fiction

Notes and references

Notes

References

External links 
 Russia professor admits murder after woman's arms found in bag

1956 births
Living people
20th-century Russian historians
21st-century Russian historians
21st-century Russian writers
Chevaliers of the Légion d'honneur
French–Russian translators
Historians of the Napoleonic Wars
Peter the Great St. Petersburg Polytechnic University alumni
Russian military historians
Saint Petersburg State University alumni
Academic staff of Saint Petersburg State University
Soviet historians
Writers from Saint Petersburg
Russian people convicted of murder
People convicted of murder by Russia